Rigels Rajku (born 27 September 1986), known professionally as Noizy, is an Albanian rapper.

Life and career

1986–2010: Early life and career beginnings 

Rigels Rajku was born on 27 September 1986 into a multi-religious Albanian family in the village of Sukth, then part of the People's Socialist Republic, present Albania. His father is a Muslim from Dibër and his mother a Catholic from Krujë. In 1997, Rajku and his family fled to London, England, as refugees to escape the war and conflicts in connection with the Albanian Civil War. He was raised in the Woolwich neighborhood of Southeast London and subsequently developed an interest in boxing and street fighting.

In 2006, Rajku returned to Albania and appeared on the third edition of Top Fest, as a solo artist with the song "Jemi OTR" and as part of his group OTR with the song "Kështu e bëjme ne". In May 2007, he collaborated with Albanian rappers J-No and Decee and returned to the competition with the song "Kur vijm na". Later that year in November 2007, he unsuccessfully participated with the song "Veç për ty" in the 9th edition of Kënga Magjike and failed to qualify for the contest's semi-finals.

2011–present: Breakthrough and continued success 

In 2015, Rajku launched his fashion label Illyrian Bloodline represented with five branches in Albania, Kosovo and North Macedonia. Starting with the release of "Gangsta Love" in August 2015, the single received an award at the 2016 Netët e Klipit Shqiptar gala in Tirana, Albania. In March 2017, the rapper was featured on German rapper Zuna's "Nummer 1", which peaked at number seven in Germany and became a certified Platinum-single by the German Bundesverband Musikindustrie (BVMI). In June 2018, "Toto", a collaboration with Austrian rapper RAF Camora released under Warner Music, was also successful in German-speaking Europe, and was certified Gold in Austria, Germany and Switzerland, respectively. Another collaboration followed in December 2018 with the release of "Gango" by Greek rapper Snik, which eventually reached number one in Greece. In March 2019, Rajku was invited as a special guest at the Palmen aus Plastik Tour by RAF Camora and German rapper Bonez MC in Cologne, Germany. In June 2019, Rajku was approached to perform at the MAD Video Music Awards 2019 in Athens, Greece. In October 2019, he collaborated a second time with Snik on "Colpo Grosso" to commercial success in the latter country.

Peaking at number 32 in Switzerland, the rapper released his fifth studio album, Epoka, in April 2020. Two months after, he released his follow-up "All Dem Talk" featuring German rapper Gzuz and British rapper Dutchavelli in June 2020. It peaked at number 16 in Switzerland and reached the top 30 in Austria and Germany, respectively. in February 2022 featured with German rapper Dardan  he released "Alles Gut".
In June 2022 he released featured with Swiss rapper Loredana he released "Heart Attack" entered the charts in German-speaking Europe, reaching number three in Switzerland, number 42 in Austria and number 61 in Germany.

Discography 

 Pak më ndryshe (2009)
 Mixtape Living Your Dream (2010)
 The Leader (2013)
 The Hardest in the Market (2014)
 Zin City (2016)
 Epoka (2020)
 ALPHA (2022)

Filmography

References

External links 

1986 births
21st-century Albanian rappers
21st-century Albanian male singers
Albanian emigrants to the United Kingdom
Albanian hip hop singers
Albanian songwriters
Living people
Musicians from London
People from Sukth
Universal Music Group artists
Warner Music Group artists